Bai Yun (born September 7, 1991) was the first female giant panda who was born at the Wolong Giant Panda Research Center in China.  From September 1996 she lived at the San Diego Zoo for more than 20 years, until being returned to China in May 2019. Bai Yun gave birth to her sixth cub in 2012 since arriving at the San Diego Zoo, considered the most surviving pandas born at a breeding facility outside of native China. Bai Yun returned to China with her last-born (Xiao Liwu) as the 23-year conservation loan of the pandas came to an end between China and San Diego Zoo Global.

History
Bai Yun's mother, Dong Dong, was caught in the wild and was at the Panyu Xiangjiang Wild Animal World in Guangzhou at the time of her death in 2011. Bai Yun's father, Pan Pan, who also sired Tian Tian, lived in Zunyi.

In the spring of 1999, Bai Yun was artificially inseminated with sperm from Shi Shi, the male panda at the zoo at that time. On August 21, 1999, Bai Yun gave birth to her first cub, Hua Mei, who is also the first giant panda born in the United States to survive to adulthood.

Bai Yun has since given birth to five other cubs, Mei Sheng (2003), Su Lin (2005), Zhen Zhen (2007), Yun Zi (2009), and Xiao Liwu (2012), all via natural mating. Bai Yun and these cubs' sire, Gao Gao, are considered the most reproductively successful panda parents in captivity. With the birth of Xiao Liwu in 2012, Bai Yun became the second oldest panda on record to give birth. The oldest panda on record to give birth was two days older than Bai Yun at the time of birth of their respective cubs. As of May 2019, Bai Yun is the mother of six, a grandmother of eight, and a great grandmother of two.

After 23 years away from her home country, Bai Yun, and her son, Xiao Liwu were safely returned to China - specifically, Dujiangyan, the site of the China Giant Panda Conservation Research Center.

References

Individual giant pandas
1991 animal births
San Diego Zoo